is a Japanese shōjo manga series written and illustrated by Kyousuke Motomi. It was serialized in Shogakukan's Betsucomi magazine from May 2007 to October 2013. Shogakukan later collected the individual chapters into 16 bound volumes under the Flower Comics imprint. Viz Media licensed the series for an English-language release in North America.

Plot
When Teru's older brother died, she was left with little more than a cellphone containing the address of an elusive character called Daisy, whom Teru's brother said would watch over her. Daisy became Teru's pillar of strength over the next few years, as he sent her encouraging words through his phone, whether inspiring or mere chatter, as she faces her life alone.

One afternoon, after bullies from the student council are mysteriously driven away, Teru accidentally breaks a school window, which results in her working for the grouchy, cruel school janitor named Tasuku Kurosaki. As Teru begins working for the unlikable school janitor, her feelings begin to surpass that of master and servant and she begins to question Daisy's true identity. Thus begins an unlikely friendship between a 16-year-old high school girl and a sly but smart 24-year-old man. As time goes by, the two become close and Teru falls for Kurosaki. What she doesn't know is that he has feelings for her too, but cannot return them for a number of reasons, the most important reason being that Kurosaki feels he caused her brother's death.

Characters

Main Characters
 
 A 16-year-old high school student, Teru is a strong-willed and kind girl who is alone after her older brother dies. She is left only with a cellphone that her brother gave her, connecting her to Daisy, who becomes Teru's source of encouragement and support through email messages. Despite never meeting him face-to-face, Teru has absolute trust in him (although she doesn't have romantic feelings for him). When she accidentally breaks a window, Teru is forced to become the "servant" of the school janitor, Tasuku Kurosaki, to pay it off. As the manga progresses, Teru's once negative feelings towards Kurosaki grow into something more romantic. However, she becomes suspicious that Kurosaki is, in fact, Daisy, and that the phone her brother left her might be more than it appears.

 
 A 24-year-old young man working as the school janitor. Kurosaki is often depicted smoking his favorite brand Philip Morris, drinking, and participating in violent acts. Despite his unpleasant attitude, he cares deeply for Teru, acting toward her with genuine kindness, and is extremely protective of her. Teru is initially unaware that Kurosaki is also Daisy, a computer hacker who worked with her brother, Souichirou, and has been entrusted with looking after her. He is described by Teru's friends to be very attractive, though he does not generally display his emotions. Much to his chagrin, he is often jokingly described as a pervert and a lolicon by his friends, as it is established among his closest companions that he has strong romantic feelings for Teru. Kurosaki has made it his mission to care for Teru on the request of his dying friend, Souichirou, though recently he has chosen to protect her as his true self, as well. Despite his strong feelings for her, Kurosaki believes that he has no right to love Teru as he is "the one that led her brother to his death." Throughout the manga, he struggles between his feelings towards her and his own conflicting memories regarding his complicated past as a hacker.

Supporting characters
 Master
  is the manager of Ohanabatake, a Western-style tea house, often seen wearing a bandana and apron. Both Kurosaki, Riko, and a number of characters refer to him as "Master" ("Masutaa" as a play on words). Despite his cordial demeanor and tendency to tease Kurosaki about his relationship with Teru, the Master can be surprisingly frightening; Kurosaki admits that the Master is far scarier than he is. The Master is fully aware of Kurosaki's activities as Daisy and has watched over Kurosaki, even before either of them became acquainted with Souichirou Kurebayashi.

 
 Riko Onizuka was a member of the design team that Teru's brother led, as well as his girlfriend. As a result, she regards Teru as a younger sister and they live together as housemates. Riko is friends with Kurosaki and often subtly serves as his adviser on his situation with Teru, frequently teasing him or acting violently toward him if she thinks he has acted inappropriately towards Teru. She is also the school counselor at Teru's high school. Riko is 30-years-old.

 
 Kiyoshi is Teru's best friend and a classmate, as well as a scholarship student. He attempted to find out more about why Teru was left so impoverished after her brother's death, despite Souichirou's reputation as a brilliant engineer. However, he ended up endangering both himself and Teru, until he is saved by Kurosaki. An intelligent boy who is able to exercise discretion, the Master reveals to Kiyoshi the true identity of Daisy as a gesture of trust. Afterwards, Kurosaki employs Kiyoshi as a second "servant" and another set of eyes to protect Teru, though Kiyoshi does not hesitate to poke fun at Kurosaki's affection for Teru.

 
 The Chairman of Teru and Kurosaki's high school, Andou is a former colleague of Daisy and Teru's brother. He initially appears as the substitute janitor for Kurosaki. While he appears as a comical character who often appears from odd, small, and dark places, such as vents and garbage cans, and enjoys being beaten up, Andou is serious whenever matters concerning Daisy arise and acts as the group's leader during investigations. His nickname, Andy, came from Souichirou.

 
 The Student Council President, an attractive girl who leads the student council to bully scholarship students like Teru and Kiyoshi and privatize school facilities. She has a tendency to enter bad relationships with unsavory men. Thanks to Teru's kindness, she gradually stops bullying and entering bad relationships. Though Rena does not admit it, Teru becomes one of her first true friends, and she indirectly tries to help Teru develop her relationship with Kurosaki. It is hinted that she later has feelings for Kiyoshi.

 
 One of Teru's classmates and friends, Haruka acts as the leader of sorts in Teru's group of friends and encourages Teru's relationship with Kurosaki. She is the first friend that Teru confides in with her knowledge that she is aware that Kurosaki and Daisy are the same person. Haruka is frequently the first to come to Teru's defense at school, often leading their other friends to follow suit. She is a member of the school's art club, track team, and ghost club.

 
 One of Daisy's former co-workers, described as persistent, but not terribly cunning. He comes to Teru's school as the new PC instructor and administrator for information management, but in truth hopes to get close to Teru to obtain her cellphone, believing it contains unreleased software Souchirou had been designing before his death. While his first attempt is thwarted by Kurosaki, Takeda chooses to stop harassing Teru because of her resolve and kindness after his second attempt. He subsequently becomes an infrequent ally to Daisy.

Others
 
 Souichirou Kurebayashi is the deceased brother of Teru Kurebayashi. Respected and admired as a very talented computer engineer, he led a team of engineers that included Tasuku Kurosaki and Riko Onizuka. Little is known about him, though he has been alternately shown as comically affectionate towards his sister and those he cares about, to being serious and empathetic. Before his death, Souichirou supposedly developed software that was to sell for a very high price but mysteriously disappeared. He forced the role of Daisy onto his friend Kurosaki. It is eventually revealed that Souichirou died of stomach cancer; instead of receiving treatment, Souichirou had invested his remaining time into solving the virus code Kurosaki had been forced to reproduce in order to save Kurosaki. In turn, Kurosaki is heavily burdened with the belief that he indirectly caused his friend's death.

 
 The former information technology teacher and the system administrator of the school's information network. He was involved in a relationship with Rena and was an adviser to the Student Council. However, he used his position to embezzle funds from the school's budget until Teru solicits Daisy's help in order to expose Arai's corruption. Arai is fired soon afterward but is forced to become a pawn in a series of illegal activities targeting Daisy. Out of concern for Rena's safety, he approaches Teru to disclose information that would expose the organization's coercion.

 
 Initially introduced as the attractive school nurse, Mori appears to be an air-headed woman who often makes blunt, thinly-veiled insults against Teru. However, Kurosaki gradually becomes suspicious of what Mori is capable of when she tries to use Teru to expose Daisy. In reality, she is actually the true culprit behind various attacks on Teru and Kurosaki, all to obtain information regarding a dangerous project that Kurosaki had been responsible for creating. Because she had been hired by Andou's predecessor as chairman of the school, her background is unknown. When her true identity is exposed, she disappears from the school and remains at large.

 
 A mysterious and eerie boy with an uncanny passing resemblance to Teru's older brother, Souichirou, and a wide grin that makes him appear maniacal. To conceal his appearance, he wears a hoodie and he usually carries a yo-yo around. His behavior is erratic and seemingly remorseless, though he is exceptionally attached and affectionate towards Chiharu Mori, whom he works with as an accomplice. Though he is later identified as a gifted hacker, Akira is a very poor operative due to his childish emotional state resulting from the special treatment he received until that point. Akira displays a vindictive interest in Teru and enjoys hurting her to try and upset Kurosaki, whom he blames for unknown reasons relating to his past. It is later revealed that he had been working for a man named "Antler" in order to obtain M's Testament.

 
 Professor Hideo Midorikawa is a colleague of Souichirou Kurebayashi. He is known to be a good father figure to Souichiro, but he is also said to be the cause of the death of Kurosaki's father when he exposed him as a spy.

 
 Father of Kurosaki. He also worked with Souichiro and Professor Midorikawa. After being accused of being a spy against the company they worked for, he later died in suspicious circumstances. After witnessing his death, Kurosaki vowed he would take vengeance, which made him create the virus Daisy, thus earning him the same nickname.

 Teru's friends
 Teru's other friends include a helmet-hair girl named  and buck-teeth boy named  who like each other, as well as an overweight boy named , and a girl who pulls her bangs back and wears her hair in a ponytail named . A comical group who support one another, they look to Teru as their leader and are very loyal to her and to each other.

Manga
Written and illustrated by Kyousuke Motomi, Dengeki Daisy was serialized in Shogakukan's monthly shōjo manga magazine Betsucomi from the June 2007 issue (released in May) to the November 2013 issue (released on October 12, 2013). The individual chapters were collected into 16 tankōbon (bound volumes) by publisher Shogakukan.

The series is licensed for an English-language release in North America by Viz Media. It is also licensed for regional language releases in Taiwan by Ever Glory Publishing, in France by Kazé Manga, and in Italy by Flashbook Edizioni.

List of volumes

Reception
In the 2011 About.com Manga Readers' Choice Awards, Dengeki Daisy was voted as the best new shōjo manga series of 2010 by North American fans.

References

External links
 Dengeki Daisy at Viz Media
 
  
 

2007 manga
Romance anime and manga
School life in anime and manga
Shogakukan manga
Shōjo manga
Viz Media manga